Eetu Mäkiniemi (born 19 April 1999) is a Finnish professional ice hockey goaltender for the San Jose Barracuda of the American Hockey League (AHL) while under contract to the San Jose Sharks of the National Hockey League (NHL). He was drafted 104th overall by the Carolina Hurricanes in the fourth round of the 2017 NHL Entry Draft.

Playing career

Europe
As a youth, Mäkiniemi played minor hockey for Kiekko-Vantaa before playing junior hockey for Jokerit. He represented Jokerit U20 in 2016–17 and 2017–18 for the Junior Club World Cup (JCWC).

Mäkiniemi was transferred to Kiekko-Vantaa for the 2018–19 Mestis season, however, he was out for part of the season with a hip injury.

In April 2019, Ilves signed Mäkiniemi to a two-year contract with a one-year extension option. On 28 December 2019, he made his Liiga debut in a 2–1 win against KooKoo. On 28 November 2020, he recorded his first Liiga shutout against KalPa with 24 shots saved.

North America
On 1 May 2021, the Carolina Hurricanes signed Mäkiniemi to a two-year, entry-level contract. Mäkiniemi in his first 14 appearances for the Hurricanes' AHL affiliate, the Chicago Wolves, posted a sparking 11–2–1 mark with a .922 save percentage and two shutouts, and he yielded two goals or less nine times, including a 41-save performance at Milwaukee on 22 October 2021, to earn a 3–2 win in his AHL debut.

On 13 July 2022, Mäkiniemi, Steven Lorentz and a third-round pick in the 2023 NHL Entry Draft were traded to the San Jose Sharks in exchange for Brent Burns and Lane Pederson. He made his NHL debut on 7 December 2022, in a 6–5 overtime loss to the Vancouver Canucks.

Career statistics

Awards and honors

References

External links
 

1999 births
Living people
Carolina Hurricanes draft picks
Chicago Wolves players
Finnish expatriate ice hockey players in the United States
Finnish ice hockey goaltenders
Ilves players
Kiekko-Vantaa players
KOOVEE players
San Jose Barracuda players
San Jose Sharks players
Sportspeople from Vantaa